Gidman is a surname. Notable people with the surname include:

Alex Gidman (born 1981), English cricketer and coach
John Gidman (born 1954), English footballer
Will Gidman (born 1985), English cricketer

See also
Gilman (disambiguation)